John C. Zak (previously credited as John Zak), born June 6, 1954 in Washington D.C., United States, is an American television soap opera director, producer, documentary film maker, voice over actor, and radio presenter.  Zak was Supervising Producer and director on the international television series, The Bold and the Beautiful. He has consulted for Endemol, RTL 4, and Franz Marx Films.

Zak made three documentary films on Hawaiian cultural themes: Hawaiian Healing, Hawaiian Meditations, and Pule Wailele. Hawaiian Healing screened at the Hawaii International Film Festival. Pule Wailele screened at the Maui Film Festival and the Big Island Film Festival.

Zak is also a radio host and producer, having originated “Classical Pacific,” a classical music series for Hawaii Public Radio. He hosts “Evening Concert” on HPR 2.

Zak graduated magna cum laude from UCLA and is a member of Phi Beta Kappa. He was a two-term governor of the Academy of Television Arts and Sciences, and is a member of the Directors Guild of America and the Screen Actors Guild.

Directing credits

The Bold and the Beautiful
 Coordinating Producer (1989)
 Producer (1989-1996)
 Supervising Producer (1996-1999)
 Director (1990s)

Capitol
 Director (1986)

Days of Our Lives
 Director (1980s)

General Hospital
 Lighting Director (1976-1982)
 Director (1987-1988)

One Life to Live
 Director (2004-2005)

Rituals
 Director (1980s)

Santa Barbara
 Director (1984-1985)

Spyder Games
 Director (2001)

The Young and the Restless
 Director (1980s)

Awards and nominations
Daytime Emmy Award
Nominated, 2002, Directing, Spyder Games
Winner, 1982, Outstanding Achievement in Design Excellence for a Daytime Drama Series, General Hospital

Primetime Emmy Award
Nominated, 1983, Outstanding Lighting Direction (electronic) For a Series, Benson

References

External links

John C. Zak at TVcom

American television directors
1954 births
Living people